USCGC Confidence (WMEC-619) is a United States Coast Guard medium endurance cutter.

History
Construction of the U.S. Coast Guard Cutter Confidence began at the United States Coast Guard Yard in Curtis Bay, Maryland, in 1965 and was completed in 1966. Fifth of 16 vessels in the class, Confidence was designed for search and rescue, law enforcement, and alien migrant interdiction operations (AMIO). She originally was assigned to the Seventeenth Coast Guard District for operations in the waters of Alaska, with her home port at Kodiak, Alaska, and began operating there in 1966. In 1968, she came to the aid of the three-man crew of the fishing vessel Chirikof, who had abandoned ship into a skiff without oars when Chirikof sank off Kodiak Island on 29 February and then drifted until sighted by the cargo ship Chena on 1 March; they were too weak from hypothermia to climb Chenas Jacob's ladder, so Confidence arrived on the scene and rescued them from the skiff.

In the spring of 1983, following 17 years in Alaskan waters, Confidence was reassigned to the Thirteenth Coast Guard District and was home-ported in Port Angeles, Washington. During her time in the Pacific Northwest, Confidences crew seized 17 foreign and U.S. vessels for violations of U.S. law. This was the largest maritime seizure of cocaine on the United States West Coast at the time.

Confidence was decommissioned and sent to the United States Coast Guard Yard in February 1987 for a major overhaul, referred to as a Midlife Maintenance Availability. Modifications included the installation of a new electronics package to increase the ship's effectiveness, new engines and smokestacks to increase efficiency, and habitability was improved. In October 1988, Confidence was commissioned back into service and sent to her new home port at Port Canaveral, Florida. Now the ship is normally assigned to patrol the waters off the southern coast of the United States, the Gulf of Mexico, and the Caribbean. Her primary missions are Counter Drug operations, Alien Migrant Interdiction Operations (AMIO), Homeland Security Operations, fisheries law enforcement, and Search and Rescue (SAR).

Since the fall of 1991, Confidence has been heavily involved in AMIO, including the interdiction of Haitian, Cuban, and Dominican Republic migrants attempting to illegally enter the U.S. One highlight of these operations was Confidences participation in Operation Able Vigil in 1993, and rescued 1,123 Cuban migrants in less than four weeks. The busiest day resulted in the interdiction of 346 migrants from 46 separate rafts and boats in just 16 hours. In Spring 1992, Confidence participated in Operation Able Manner, interdicting 428 Haitian migrants. Later that year, the ship was the primary platform for Operation Restore Dignity off the coast of Haiti, recovering 78 Haitians who perished when their ferry sank.

In 2001, Confidence was outfitted with an Over the Horizon rigid hull inflatable boat, designed to transport law enforcement teams at high speeds for long distances independent of the cutter.

From January 2003 until June 2005, Confidence interdicted over 1,100 Cuban, Haitian, and Dominican migrants with several noteworthy cases. In November 2004, Confidence rescued 82 migrants from a  Haitian sailing vessel taking on water off the coast of the Bahamas. In June 2005 during a ten-day period, Confidence safely intercepted 162 Haitians from a  vessel on the Great Bahama Bank, seven Cubans from a makeshift vessel sinking in the Old Bahama Channel and 111 Haitians in a  vessel in  seas north of Great Inagua, Bahamas.

The year 2006 was the 40th anniversary of Confidence’s initial commissioning. The original life expectancy of this cutter class was 30 years, but it is expected she will remain in service an additional 10–15 years. During her service, Confidence has been awarded the United States Secretary of Transportation’s Gold Medal for Outstanding Achievement, 6 Coast Guard Unit Commendations, 5 Coast Guard Meritorious Unit Commendations, 3 National Defense Service Medals, 4 Humanitarian Service Medals, and 4 Special Operations Ribbons. Following the ship’s 2007 Tailored Annual Cutter Training, Confidence earned her 10th consecutive Coast Guard Battle "E" Ribbon for Operational Excellence.

References

External links
Confidence home page

Ships of the United States Coast Guard
Reliance-class cutters
1966 ships
Ships built by the United States Coast Guard Yard
Historic American Engineering Record in Florida